Lists of painters by nationality cover painters, and are organized by region and nationality.

US and Canada 

American painters (before 1900)
American painters (1900–present)
Canadian painters

Europe 

 Albanian painters
 Armenian painters
 Austrian painters
 Azerbaijani painters
 Belgian painters
 Belarusian painters
 Bosnian painters
 British painters
 Bulgarian painters
 Croatian painters
 Cypriot painters
 Czech painters
 Danish painters
 Dutch painters
 Estonian painters
 Finnish painters
 Flemish painters
 French painters
German painters
Georgian painters
Greek painters
Hungarian painters
Icelandic painters
Irish painters
Italian painters
Luxembourgish painters
Norwegian painters
Polish painters
Portuguese painters
Romanian painters
Russian painters 
19th-century Russian painters
20th-century Russian painters
Painters of Saint Petersburg Union of Artists
Russian landscape painters
Serbian painters
Slovak painters
Spanish painters
Swedish painters
Turkish painters
Ukrainian painters

Asia 

 Azerbaijani painters
 Bangladeshi painters
 Chinese painters
 Filipino painters
 Georgian painters
Indian painters
Indonesian painters
Japanese painters
Nihonga painters
Kazakhstani painters
Korean painters
Latvian painters
 Lebanese painters
 Turkish painters

Middle East 

 Lebanese painters
 Azerbaijani painters
 Iranian painters
 Israeli painters
 Turkish painters

Latin America 

 Brazilian painters
 Cuban painters
 Dominican painters
 Ecuadorian painters

Africa 
 Egyptian painters

Oceania 
Australian painters

See also 
Lists of painters
Lists of artists